The Nikon Coolpix P1000 is a superzoom digital bridge camera produced by Nikon, released on September 6, 2018. It has a 125× optical zoom, its focal range going from 24 mm to 3000 mm 35 mm equivalent focal length. As of September 2022, it is the greatest-zooming bridge camera available, surpassing its predecessor, the Nikon Coolpix P900.

References

P1000
Superzoom cameras
Cameras introduced in 2018